Nadia Jamil (Born: October 19, 1975) (also known as Nadia Fazal Jamil) is a Pakistani actress and host who is known for Balu Mahi, Behadd and Damsa, a story about child trafficking.

Early life and education 
Jamil was born in London on October 19, 1975 but moved to Lahore when she was nine. She attended the school of Convent of Jesus and Mary, Lahore. She holds a Masters of English degree in Literature.

Jamil completed a Bachelor’s in Drama and Creative Writing at Hampshire College, USA. She also studied at Allegheny College . She completed her International Fellowship at the Globe Theatre, London.

Career 
Jamil has been a Pakistani actress and host for the past two decades. Jamil started her career in the 1990s.

Jamil is a trustee of Sunjan Nagar, which is Raza Kazim’s school for financially-deprived girls. She performed a theatre project with them at Al-Hamra. She also serves as an ambassador for Girl Rising, a project which raises awareness about girls' education. She teaches theatre and drama and is working on a few projects with institutes like Oxford University Press and Aitchison, Kids Campus.

Personal life 
She is married to Ali Pervaiz and is mother to two sons, Rakae and Mir Vali.

In April 2020, Jamil was diagnosed with stage 1 breast cancer/grade 3 tumour. She underwent successful surgery soon afterwards and by August was out of danger.

Jamil worked in a video "Alvida", which is a cancer awareness campaign. 

Nadia was sexually abused at 4.

Notable works

Accolades

References

Living people
Pakistani television actresses
Actresses from Lahore
1980 births